Selaparang Airport , was the sole airport serving the island of Lombok and the city of Mataram, the capital of the province of West Nusa Tenggara, Indonesia until its closure on 30 September 2011. The IATA code AMI came from the nearby port of Ampenan, now a part of Mataram. The airport was operated by PT. Angkasa Pura 1 (PERSERO). The new Lombok International Airport operated under the IATA code AMI until late November 2011, toward the end of the month the IATA code LOP was formally listed for the new airport and was slowly being transitioned by the airlines operating to Lombok.

Selaparang Airport was closed on 30 September 2011 to facilitate transfer of resources and operations to the new Lombok International Airport (Bandara Internasional Lombok - BIL)  in Central Lombok Regency.

International gateway facilities
Customs & Excise: no longer available
Immigration: no longer available
Quarantine; Health, Animals, Plants & Fish: no longer available

Departure tax

Indonesian airports frequently levy taxes upon departing passengers. Passengers departing Lombok's Selaparang Airport were subject to a departure tax of Rp 75,000 for international departures and Rp 30.000 for domestic departures.

Facilities

General services
ATM: no longer available
Money Changer: no longer available
Post Office: on main road opposite airport
Public Telephone

Airport taxi services

Taxi Mataram (Airport Taksi) operated from the airport until 30 September 2011. They had an exclusive contract to provide taxi services to arriving passengers at Selaparang airport.
Arriving passengers purchased taxi coupons at dedicated Airport taxi service counters at both the domestic and the international terminals.
The islands other taxi operators were only able to drop off passengers inside the airport and cannot pick up passengers within the airport grounds.
Prices were set by destination/zone with Lombok comprising 22 price zones. The last zone and pricing adjustment was issued by West Nusa Tenggara government decree in 2009.

Vehicle parking
Area : 7334 m2
Capacity : 316 sedan / motorbikes / buses
Private vehicles including cars, shuttle buses, buses and motorbikes had access the airport's public parking area and terminal drop off zones.
Public access to the parking area is by a dedicated roadway entered through the main terminal gate from both eastbound and westbound roadways of the nearby Jalan Adi Sucipto which runs parallel to the airports single runway.
The airport operators charged an entrance fee for all vehicles entering the airport including taxis, cars, buses and motorbikes until the official closure of the airport.

Security facilities
Baggage X-Ray: no longer available
Walk through metal detector: no longer available
Explosive detector: no longer available
Hand-wand metal detector: no longer available

Fuel supplies
Jet A1, without icing inhibitor.

Meteorological services
Observation: ADA: unknown refer to Bandara Internasional Lombok WADL
Forecast: ADA: unknown refer to Bandara Internasional Lombok WADL

Power supply
Grid power : PLN : 10 385 KVA
On-site genset : 9100 KVA: serviceability unknown

Airport classification
Class IIA
Runway dimensions
 Length: 2100 m
 Width:  40 m
Aircraft types
Narrow body passenger aircraft
 Boeing 737
 Airbus A319, A320
 Fokker F100
Apron Area : 28 181 m2
Parking position stands
 Narrow body Alt.1 : 8 aircraft
 Narrow body Alt.2 : 7 aircraft
 Narrow body Alt.3 : 0 aircraft

Taxiway
Area total size : 4830 m2
 Taxiway A:Exit T / W, 105m x 23m, PCN: 24 / f / C / x / T
 Taxiway B:Exit T / W, 105m x 23m, PCN: 30 / f / C / x / T

PKP-PK
All the mobile facilities were removed to Bandara Internasional Lombok WADL at the time of cessation of operations at Selaparang.
The resources listed below were those that previously served the operational airport until 30 September 2011.
CAT-VI:
Total fleet : 7 unit. Configuration: Foam Tender 3 unit: no longer available
Nurse tender : 1 unit: no longer available
Rescue tender : 2 unit: no longer available
Command car : 1 unit: no longer available
Ambulance : 2 units: no longer available
Rescue Boat : Not Available
Salvage : Not Available

Airfield lighting
Approach Light Runway Light: operational status unknown
PAPI, REILSt: operational status unknown
Taxiway Light: operational status unknown
Flood Light Apront: operational status unknown
Rotating Beacon, Signal Areast: operational status unknown

Flight telecommunications

All demountable facilities were removed to Bandara Internasional Lombok at the time of cessation of operations at Selaparang.
The resources listed below were those that previously served the operational airport until D\30 September 2011.
HF / VHF, HF SSB, VSATt: operational status unknown
ADCt: operational status unknown
AMSC, RECORDING SYSTEM, facsimile, HT, MOBILE RADIOt: operational status unknown

Terminal statistics
International passenger terminal
 Area: 1600 m2
 Capacity 47 000 pax per year
Domestic passenger terminal
 Area: 3196 m2
Capacity 285 000 pax per year
Cargo Terminal
 Area: 420 m2

Specifications provided may be subject to change

Future uses of the Selaparang airport

Reactivation
In February 2012, PT Angkasa Pura I (PT AP I) has signed a Memorandum of Understanding with Merukh Enterprise for utilizing the airport as aircraft maintenance area. PT AP I has also agreed some area of the airport is used as Lombok Institute Flying Technology (LIFT) which 51 percent stake is kept by domestic investor and the rest is kept by Castel Mark Limited, Hong Kong. The airport definitely closed for regular flights, but opens for charter flights.

Proposed development as a Regional Aviation Hub
The future use of Selaparang Airport to develop a General Aviation Hub for Indonesia may offer considerable opportunities for Indonesia's tourism triangle of Bali, Lombok and Sumbawa. Currently national law restricts the development of General Aviation in Indonesia due to national laws preventing other than Indonesian registered pilots to operate inside Indonesian airspace without a suitably qualified Indonesian pilot present in the cockpit.

References 
For specifications source please see   PT Angkasa Pura I

External links 
IATA: AMI, ICAO: WADA) Website
 Directorate General of Civil Aviation Republic of Indonesia

Lombok
Airports disestablished in 2011
Airports in West Nusa Tenggara
Defunct airports in Indonesia
Transport in West Nusa Tenggara